Myron is a novel by American author Gore Vidal, published in 1974. It was written as a sequel to his 1968 bestseller Myra Breckinridge. The novel was published shortly after an anti-pornography ruling by the Supreme Court; Vidal responded by replacing the profanity in his novel with the names of the Justices involved (e.g., "He thrust his enormous Rehnquist deep within her Whizzer White", etc.)

Plot summary

Myra Breckinridge, the transsexual who terrorized Hollywood with dildo-rape and lesbianism, has transformed back into her former self, the literally and figuratively castrated Myron.

One night, while watching the movie "Siren of Babylon" on the late show, he/she is transported to the set of the 1948 film through the television. It's Myra's dream come true, and Myron's nightmare. As Myron tries to adapt to life inside an endlessly repeating B-movie, Myra slowly starts creeping her way back into Myron's head, making a connection with a gay member of the community to obtain dresses and wigs. Her lapses back into Myron's personality are strongly encouraged by a character slyly based on Norman Mailer (though at one point he drunkenly hits on Myra), while most of the others on the set seem to prefer Myra to Myron. She attempts to castrate a crew member, then tries to castrate herself and partially succeeds in acquiring silicone implants. While Myron desperately searches for a way off the set (running into Richard Nixon along the way, who is considering taking up residence in "Siren of Babylon" in order to escape the Watergate hearings), Myra wants to stay permanently.

Eventually, Myra/Myron trades places with Maria Montez, the star of the film. Myra is ecstatic and Myron disappears entirely from the narrative for a time. But when Montez, inhabited by Myra, coincidentally meets the 1948 Myron (who at this point is a child, possessed by the soul of a perplexed Maria Montez) their respective personalities are restored to their original bodies, returning Myron at once to his living room in 1970s California. The changes wrought by Myra's running amok on the set of "Siren of Babylon" continue to influence the present and the book ends with a former cowboy actor in the film, now a transsexual, being elected Republican governor of Arizona.

Glossary
In his introduction to the novel, Vidal mentions the Supreme Court decision Miller v. California, which in his words "leaves to each community the right to decide what is pornography." Saying that the decision has "alarmed and confused peddlers of smut" by eliminating guidelines, Vidal says he has decided to substitute the names of the five Justices who voted for the decision, plus the names of anti-pornography crusaders Charles Keating of Citizens for Decent Literature and Father Morton A. Hill, S.J. of Morality in Media (whom Vidal had debated on The David Susskind Show in 1968), for the "dirty words". He has done this to conform to the Supreme Court's imposition of  the "community standards" test, as he wants "to conform with the letter and spirit of the Court's decision."

These are the words and their substitutions:

blackmun: ass
burger: fuck
father hills: tits
keating: shit
powells: balls
rehnquist: cock
whizzer white: cunt

Later editions of the novel do not use these substitutions.

Sources

External links
 Review: Myra Lives! TIME magazine, Monday, Oct. 21, 1974

1974 American novels
Novels by Gore Vidal
Sequel novels
Hollywood novels
Novels with transgender themes
Random House books
American LGBT novels
1970s LGBT novels